Brian Raider is an American producer from Los Angeles, CA.

Early life
Raider graduated from George W. Hewlett High School in Hewlett, New York, in 1998, and went on to the University of Maryland, College Park. He moved to New York City to work in the mortgages and investments department of Wells Fargo, and then in stocks and bonds at JPMorgan. After walking by the set of a film or TV production, he became friendly with a producer, and over the next two years began working on productions as he learned the film business. Raider served as line producer on the comedy Uncle Marvin's Apartment. It was released on September 20, 2010.

Career
Raider has worked on the eight-episode Fuse television series G-life, and on 13 episodes of the Velocity show Car Crazy in 2013. He served in various production capacities on films including the aforesaid two as well as Grey Skies (2010),  and Americons, for which he was line producer. In addition, he has worked as a production manager on such television series as Judge Joe Brown, Judge Judy and Germany’s Next Top Model.

Raider was the executive in charge on the television series The Carbonaro Effect.

Television and filmography

References

External links
Brian Raider media

Living people
People from Los Angeles
Film producers from New York (state)
Film producers from California
Television producers from New York (state)
Television producers from California
Wells Fargo employees
JPMorgan Chase employees
George W. Hewlett High School alumni
University of Maryland, College Park alumni
Year of birth missing (living people)